Doğanyurt, formerly Hoşalay, is a small town in the Kastamonu Province in the Black Sea region of Turkey. It is the seat of Doğanyurt District. Its population is 997 (2021).

Kerembe Burnu, the ancient Cape Karambis, is located to the northwest of Doğanyurt. The promontory, 225 km distant from  the Sarych headland, is the nearest point on the Anatolian coast to the Crimean Peninsula and has for centuries served as a nautical landmark for those seeking to cross the Black Sea at its narrowest point.

References

Populated places in Kastamonu Province
Fishing communities in Turkey
Populated coastal places in Turkey
Doğanyurt District